Jeffery Michael Buckey (born August 7, 1974) is a former professional American football offensive lineman who played four seasons in the National Football League (NFL) for the Miami Dolphins and San Francisco 49ers.  He was drafted in the seventh round of the 1996 NFL Draft with the 230th overall pick.
He is California state discus record holder for juniors, posting a top ten all time California throw of 210 feet. Jeff credits much of his success to the people who stuck with him during his rookie year, when he began starting for the Miami Dolphins under Pro Football Hall of Fame coach Jimmy Johnson.

References

External links
Just Sports Stats

1974 births
American football offensive linemen
Miami Dolphins players
San Francisco 49ers players
Stanford Cardinal football players
Living people
San Francisco Demons players